Xipu is a railway station on the Chengdu–Dujiangyan intercity railway, Line 2  and on Line 6 of the Chengdu Metro. The station is located in Pidu District, Chengdu, Sichuan, China.

Station layout

Xipu station houses the first implementation of cross-platform interchange between different train categories in China, between Line 2 of the Chengdu Metro and the Chengdu–Dujiangyan intercity railway. The Chengdu Metro Line 2 platforms began operation on 8 June 2013.

References

External links 
 

Railway stations in Sichuan
Railway stations in China opened in 2010
Chengdu Metro stations